The 1988 NCAA Division III football season, part of the college football season organized by the NCAA at the Division III level in the United States, began in August 1988, and concluded with the NCAA Division III Football Championship, also known as the Stagg Bowl, in December 1988 at Garrett-Harrison Stadium in Phenix City, Alabama. The Ithaca Bombers won their third Division III championship by defeating the Central (IA) Dutch, 39−24.

Conference standings

Conference champions

Postseason
The 1988 NCAA Division III Football Championship playoffs were the 16th annual single-elimination tournament to determine the national champion of men's NCAA Division III college football. The championship Stagg Bowl game was held at Garrett-Harrison Stadium in Phenix City, Alabama for the 14th time and for the fourth consecutive year. Like the previous three tournaments, this year's bracket featured sixteen teams.

Playoff bracket

See also
1988 NCAA Division I-A football season
1988 NCAA Division I-AA football season
1988 NCAA Division II football season

References